Braughing  is a village and civil parish, between the rivers Quin and Rib, in the non-metropolitan district of East Hertfordshire, part of the English county of Hertfordshire. Braughing gave its name to a county division in Hertfordshire, known as a "hundred". This was a rural district from 1935 to 1974. The population at the 2011 Census was 1,203. This includes Bozen Green, Braughing Friars and Brent Pelham.

History

Prehistory
There is some evidence of human activity in the Mesolithic, Neolithic and Bronze Age, but settled habitation began in the Iron Age, around the 3rd century BC. It was possibly a trading post, situated on the navigable extreme of the Rib, providing a route to the larger River Lea. In the late Iron Age (100BC - 43AD) it was the site of the largest 'Celtic' mint discovered in Europe.

Roman times

There were significant Iron Age and Roman settlements at Wickham Hill, near Braughing. This is situated at the junction of several major Roman roads, including Ermine Street (now the A10), Stane Street (now the A120) and the Great Chesterford Road. This covers at least 36 hectares.

When the River Rib is in full flood, bricks, tiles and other more interesting artefacts from the Roman settlement are washed onto its banks.

Saxon times
After the Roman period it was settled by the Anglo-Saxons: the earliest form of the name Braughing is Breahinga, Old English for the people of Breahha, who was probably a local leader. It is mentioned in the Domesday Book (1086) at Brachinges.

Gatesbury
Little remains of this hamlet, which lies to the east of the B1368 close to the Puckeridge junction. Originally part of Westmill parish, Gatesbury is now within the parish of Braughing. Its name originates from the Gatesbury family, who held the manor from the late 12th century up to the 15th century, when it was passed to the FitzHerberts.

Customs

Old Man's Day
On 2nd October 1571, as the funeral bell was being tolled, the coffin of a local farmer, Matthew Wall, was being carried down Fleece Lane towards the Parish Church of St Mary the Virgin.

Wall's fiancée and other mourners were deeply distressed. As they made their way to the funeral service, one of pallbearers slipped on the damp autumn leaves and they dropped the coffin - waking the young man. Confused and wondering where on earth he was, he began frantically hitting the inside of the wooden case with his fist. The mourners removed the lid and were overjoyed to find him alive.

Matthew had probably been in a coma after suffering from what is believed to be a form of epilepsy.  A year later, he married his fiancée; he lived many more years and had two sons. When he did die in 1595, his will made financial provision for Fleece Lane to be swept each year, after which the funeral bell, and then a wedding peal, were to be rung. The money, invested in 'Braughing Parish Charities' also paid for his grave to be pegged with brambles to prevent grazing sheep from damaging it.

The 2nd October is still known as 'Old Man's Day'. The tradition continues and schoolchildren now sweep the leaves from the lane, the bells are rung, and a short service is held at Matthew Wall's graveside.

Sausages
The Braughing Pork Sausage was first made in 1954 by Douglas White and his wife Anna.  The recipe remained the same until the company was sold to Musk's of Newmarket. Local sausages are served in the village's pubs.

Wheelbarrow race
On the second weekend of July the Braughing Wheelbarrow race takes place. This event started in 1964 with teams of two pushing a wheelbarrow round a 400 metre course through the village streets, starting and finishing in the village ford.

Transport

There was a station on the ex-Great Eastern Railway St Margaret's - Buntingford branch which closed in 1964. The station featured in the comedy film Happy Ever After which starred David Niven and George Cole in 1953. The location was temporarily renamed Rathbarney, an Irish hamlet.

Famous residents

John Brograve, (1538–1613), a lawyer and politician, was the Member of Parliament for Preston, and was custos rotulorum, keeper of the county records of Hertfordshire for thirty years.
Brigadier Richard Hanbury was High Sheriff of Hertfordshire in 1960.
Brodie Henderson, (1869 – 1936), was in charge of railway lines used to transport Allied troops and supplies during the First World War and worked for many railroad corporations across South America, Australasia and Africa.  He was High Sheriff of Hertfordshire in 1924.
George Meriton (born in Braughing, circa 1564 and died 1624) was a churchman who became Dean of Peterborough in 1612 and Dean of York in 1617.
 Vera Strodl Dowling (1918–2015), pilot
 Charles Ward (born in Braughing in 1875) was an English cricketer who died in 1954.
Sally Wentworth, the pseudonym used by Doreen Hornsblow (1930s –2001), was a romantic novelist and writer of seventy novels in Mills & Boon from 1977 to 1999.

See also
 The Hundred Parishes

References

External links

Braughing community website
Braughing at Roman-Britain.co.uk
Braughing at Google maps
Photos of Braughing at Geograph.org.uk
Braughing (A Guide to Old Hertfordshire)
Ford Bridge, Braughing Grade II listed - British Listed Buildings
Pic of the fording of the River Rib at Braughing - Geograph.org.uk

 
Villages in Hertfordshire
Civil parishes in Hertfordshire
East Hertfordshire District